Rosinka Chaudhuri (D.Phil. Oxon) is Professor of Cultural Studies and also current Director at the Centre for Studies in Social Sciences, Calcutta (CSSSC). She is a member of St Hugh’s College, Oxford, and has held visiting positions at King's College London, Delhi University, Cambridge University and Columbia University.

Personal life 
She is married to Amit Chaudhuri, who is a renowned Indian novelist, poet, and essayist in English-language.

Academic life 
Her books include Gentlemen Poets in Colonial Bengal: Emergent Nationalism and the Orientalist Project (Seagull: 2002), Freedom and Beef-Steaks: Colonial Calcutta Culture (Orient Blackswan: 2012) and The Literary Thing: History, Poetry and the Making of a Modern Literary Culture (Oxford University Press: 2013, Peter Lang: 2014). She has also edited Derozio, Poet of India: A Definitive Edition (Oxford University Press, 2008), and, with Elleke Boehmer, The Indian Postcolonial (Routledge, 2010). Her most recent publication is A History of Indian Poetry in English, published by Cambridge University Press, New York, in 2016.
In addition she has translated and introduced the complete text of the letters Rabindranath Tagore wrote his niece Indira Debi as a young man, calling it Letters from a Young Poet (1887-94) (Penguin Modern Classics, 2014). Currently, she is editing and introducing An Acre of Green Grass: English Writings of Buddhadeva Bose for Oxford University Press, New Delhi. Her present research is tentatively titled Young Bengal and the Empire of the Middle Classes.
Her work lies at the intersection of literature and history, in the area broadly known as Cultural Studies. She has worked on the nineteenth-century literary sphere in Bengal, looking at the formation of a modern cultural sphere in the context of episodes surrounding the writing of poetry; on Tagore, his translations from the Bengali Gitanjali as well as the incantatory musicality of his Bengali poetry; on Indian poetry in English, introducing the tradition and its development; and on Postcolonial Studies, on which she has a revisionist take. Currently she is thinking about the category into which the polemic of Postcolonial Studies seems to have retreated: World Literature, and wondering where the 'world' in World Literature is.

References 

Living people
Year of birth missing (living people)
Statutory Professors of the University of Oxford
Place of birth missing (living people)
Alumni of the University of Oxford